"Mural" is a song by American rapper Lupe Fiasco. The song appears on his fifth studio album Tetsuo & Youth.

Almost nine minutes long with no hooks, the song contains 785 unique words. This song received positive reception, highlighting Fiasco's "lyrical skill and knowledge", and calling it the best song on the album.

The song contains elements of "Chanson d'Un Jour d'Hiver", performed by Alain Mion and Cortex.

Awards and accolades
It was ranked 9 on Genius' 50 Best Rap Songs of 2015.

References

Lupe Fiasco songs
Songs written by Lupe Fiasco
2010 songs